The 10th Rhode Island Infantry Regiment served for three months in the summer 1862.  It served, along with its sister units - the 9th Rhode Island Infantry Regiment and the 10th Rhode Island Battery, in the defenses of Washington D.C.

Service
The regiment was mustered info Federal service at Providence on May 26, 1862. It moved to Washington, D. C. from May 27 to 29 and was attached to Sturgis' Command as part of the Military District of Washington.   It saw duty at Camp Frieze, Tennallytown until June 26.

It was then assigned to garrison duty in the defences of Washington. Company "A" at Fort Franklin, "B" and "K" at Fort Pennsylvania, "C" at Fort Cameron, "D" at Fort DeRussy. "E" and "I" at Fort Alexander, "F" at Fort Ripley, "G" at Fort Gaines, "H" at Battery Vermond and Battery Martin Scott and "L" near Fort Pennsylvania.

The regiment left for home on August 25 and was mustered out of service on September 1, 1862.

Company B
Company B of the 10th Regiment was made up of about 125 students from Brown University and Providence High School. Its captain for three months was Elisha Dyer, the former governor of Rhode Island. Legend has it that Brown's President Sears consented to allow his students to enlist only on the condition that Gov. Dyer accompany them.

Losses
Regiment lost 3 by disease

Notable Members
 Colonel (later Brig. Gen.) Zenas Bliss – Medal of Honor recipient for action at the Battle of Fredericksburg
 Nelson W. Aldrich, United States Senator for Rhode Island, 1881-1911

References

External links
 

Military units and formations established in 1862
Military units and formations disestablished in 1862
Units and formations of the Union Army from Rhode Island
1862 establishments in Rhode Island